Daniel Ludlow may refer to:

Daniel H. Ludlow (1924–2009), professor of religion at Brigham Young University
Daniel Ludlow (banker) (1750–1844), American banker from New York City

See also
Daniel Ludlow Kuri (born 1961), Mexican politician